Citizens Bank Building may refer to:

 Citizens Bank Building (Tampa, Florida)
 Citizens Bank (Williston, Florida), listed on the NRHP in Florida
 Citizens Bank of Vidalia, Vidalia, Georgia, listed on the NRHP in Georgia
 Citizens Banking Company, Baxley, Georgia, listed on the NRHP in Georgia
 Citizens Bank (South Bend, Indiana), listed on the NRHP in Indiana
 Citizens Bank of Lafourche, Thibodaux, Louisiana, listed on the NRHP in Louisiana
 Citizens Bank Building (Burnsville, North Carolina), listed on the NRHP in North Carolina
 Citizens Bank and Trust Company Building, Former, Waynesville, North Carolina, listed on the NRHP in North Carolina
 Citizens Bank Building (Stillwater, Oklahoma), listed on the NRHP in Oklahoma
 Bank of Dyersburg, Dyersburg, Tennessee, formerly or also known as Citizens Bank Building, NRHP-listed in Dyer County
 Citizens Bank (Clinton, Wisconsin), listed on the NRHP in Wisconsin

See also
Citizens Bank (disambiguation)